The Church of the Holy Sepulchre is a church in the Christian Quarter of the Old City of Jerusalem, believed to be the site of Jesus's empty tomb.

Holy Sepulchre, Saint Sepulchre, or variants, may also refer to:

Places and jurisdictions 
 St Sepulchre (parish), in London, England
 Sansepolcro, Arezzo, Tuscany, Italy
 Roman Catholic Diocese of Sansepolcro
 Manor of St. Sepulchre, in Dublin, Ireland
 Neuvy-Saint-Sépulchre, Indre department, France

Churches

England 
 Church of the Holy Sepulchre, Cambridge
 The Holy Sepulchre, Northampton
 St Sepulchre-without-Newgate, City of London
 Holy Sepulchre Priory, Thetford
 Church of the Holy Sepulchre, Warminghurst

Italy 
 Sansepolcro Cathedral, Sansepolcro 
 Church of San Sepolcro, Milan 
 Santo Sepolcro, Pisa
 San Sepolcro, Parma
 San Sepolcro, Piacenza
 Rucellai Sepulchre, or Chapel of the Holy Sepulchre, in the church of San Pancrazio, Florence

Other countries
 Saint-Sépulcre, Paris, France
 Monastery of Comendadoras Canonesas del Santo Sepulcro, Zaragoza, Spain
 Church of the Holy Sepulchre, Auckland, New Zealand
 Church of the Holy Sepulchre, Miechów, Poland

People 
 Dionigi di Borgo San Sepolcro (c. 1300–1342), Augustinian monk

Religious organisations 
 Canons Regular of the Holy Sepulchre, a Catholic religious order
 Canonesses Regular of the Holy Sepulchre, a Catholic female religious order 
 Order of the Holy Sepulchre, a Catholic order of knighthood
 Fathers of the Holy Sepulchre, a group of Franciscan priests
 Brotherhood of the Holy Sepulchre, an Eastern Orthodox monastic fraternity
Many places, especially in Spain, have rituals concerning the Holy Sepulchre during Holy Week, preceding Easter, and many confraternities include this in their name.

See also 

 Sepulchre (disambiguation)
 Tomb of Jesus
 Sansepolcrismo, the movement led by Mussolini that preceded Fascism